André Soares Jardine (born 8 September 1979) is a Brazilian football manager, currently in charge of Mexican club Atlético San Luis.

Career
Jardine was born in Porto Alegre, Rio Grande do Sul. After representing Grêmio's youth categories, he started studying Engineering but graduated in Physical Education at the Federal University of Rio Grande do Sul.

Jardine joined Internacional in 2003, being appointed manager of the under-10s. He took over all the club's youth categories during his ten-year stay, with his last team being the under-20s. On 24 September 2013, he returned to Grêmio after being named under-17 manager.

On 27 July 2014, after Enderson Moreira's dismissal, Jardine was named interim manager, being in charge for one match (a 2–1 loss against Vitória) before the appointment of Luiz Felipe Scolari. Subsequently, he was named assistant, but ended the year as the coordinator of the under-15s after having altercations with Scolari.

In February 2015, Jardine moved to São Paulo and was appointed at the helm of the under-20s. He was interim manager for two occasions (in 2016 and 2018) before being named assistant in March 2018. On 11 November 2018, he was named interim until the end of the campaign, replacing sacked Diego Aguirre.

On 25 November 2018, Jardine was definitely appointed manager of Tricolor for the 2019 season. The following 14 February, however, he was removed from his manager role, but was still kept at the club.

On 3 April 2019, Jardine took over the Brazil national under-20 team, replacing fired Carlos Amadeu. Later that year, he also took charge of the under-23s, following Sylvinho's abdication.

Jardine won the 2020 Summer Olympics with the under-23s, but opted to leave the national side on 3 February 2022 to take over Liga MX side Atlético San Luis.

Honours

International
Brazil U23
Summer Olympics: 2020

References

External links
 

1979 births
Living people
People from Porto Alegre
Brazilian football managers
Campeonato Brasileiro Série A managers
Grêmio Foot-Ball Porto Alegrense managers
São Paulo FC managers
Brazil national under-20 football team managers
Liga MX managers
Atlético San Luis managers
Brazilian expatriate football managers
Brazilian expatriate sportspeople in Mexico
Expatriate football managers in Mexico
Sportspeople from Porto Alegre
São Paulo FC non-playing staff